Astronomy Ireland is an astronomy association based in Ireland (including the Republic and Northern Ireland). It is a non-profit  educational organisation founded by David Moore.

History
Astronomy Ireland (AI) was founded in Dublin in 1990 by David Moore and others following a split from the Irish Astronomical Society.

Activities
 Observing sessions: Eclipses of the moon, meteor showers, favourable planetary apparitions, and other events. In Dublin, a common meeting place is beside the Papal Cross in the Phoenix Park.
 Lectures: These are recorded by the society and are made available on for download and via DVD. Astrophysicist Chris Lintott and science writer John Gribbin have delivered lectures.
 Star-B-Q: Annual barbecue held at Roundwood, County Wicklow.
 Astro-Expo: Annual astronomy and science exhibition held in Dublin.
 Astronomy Classes: Introduces new members and non-members to elementary and advanced astronomy.
 Foreign trips: Arranged to observe total solar eclipses. Turkey was visited in 2006.

Publications and media
Members are kept up-to-date by e-mail newsletters and text messages. A premium rate telephone news service alerts Irish and British astronomers to celestial events, ranging from flyovers of the International Space Station to meteor showers.

Astronomy Ireland produces a monthly magazine called "Astronomy Ireland" which is aimed mainly at amateur astronomers.

A weekly radio programme, AIRS (Astronomy Ireland Radio Show), is broadcast every Tuesday on FM radio and on the Internet. Previous shows are available from the MP3 archive on the club's website, along with recordings of other radio programmes.

Astronomy Shop
A private venture called the Astronomy Shop was owned and managed by the company's director, David Moore. This shop was liquidated in 2013. The  company Astronomy & Space Ltd. was dissolved in 2015.

See also
 List of astronomical societies

References

External links
Astronomy Ireland
Irish Federation of Astronomical Societies

Astronomy organizations
Scientific organisations based in Ireland
1990 establishments in Ireland
Scientific organizations established in 1990
Astronomy in Ireland